WGAW (1340 AM) is a radio station licensed to Gardner, Massachusetts. Established in 1946 as WHOB, the station is owned by Steven Wendell and carries a talk radio format.

History
The station signed on December 23, 1946 as WHOB. It debuted at 1490 kHz on the AM dial, and the call letters referred to one of the station's founders, District Attorney Owen A. Hoban. WHOB was originally owned by David M. Richman, a Connecticut businessman; studios were in the Colonial Hotel in Gardner.  The station's format was a variety of local news, music, and sports. One of the early stars on WHOB was a local country (then called "hillbilly") music performer named Doc Snow (real name: Edgar Arsenault). He performed live with his band, the Bar X Cowboys, and later became one of the station's announcers.

The station was sold to Emilien R. Robillard, a pharmacist, in 1954; the call letters were changed to WGAW (Gardner, Athol, Winchendon) on October 14, 1953.  Subsequently, in 1957, the station was sold again, to Charles and James Asher, who also owned WJDA in Quincy. In 1959, new owners again took over, with Judge C. Edward Rowe purchasing the station.

By the early 1990s, WGAW was experiencing financial problems due to increased competition from FM stations. The station was being run by Judge Rowe's son Douglas, who also owned WSRO, a station in Marlboro, Massachusetts.  To save money, WGAW was no longer doing local broadcasting. Rather, it was simulcasting the programming of WSRO. Subsequent owners of WGAW have included Anastos Media Group of Malta, New York (an ownership group headed by New York City television news anchor Ernie Anastos), and Northeast Broadcasting of Bedford, New Hampshire.

References

External links
 

GAW
News and talk radio stations in the United States
Radio stations established in 1946
Gardner, Massachusetts
Mass media in Worcester County, Massachusetts
1946 establishments in Massachusetts